Avicennia schaueriana is a species of tropical mangrove in the family Acanthaceae. It grows in coastal and estuarine locations along the Atlantic coast of northeastern South America, from Venezuela and the Leeward Islands through Trinidad and Tobago, the Windward Islands, the Guianas, and Brazil to Uruguay.

References

schaueriana
Mangroves
Tropical Atlantic flora
Neotropical realm flora
Plants described in 1939